was a king of the Ryukyu Kingdom, the sixth ruler of the first Shō dynasty.

Life and reign 
Shō Taikyū was the seventh son of Shō Hashi, the unifier of Okinawa Island and founder of the Ryukyu Kingdom. In 1453, he was named Prince of Goeku, and given Goeku magiri (today part of Okinawa City) as his domain.

When King Shō Kinpuku died in 1453, a succession dispute erupted between the king's son  and his younger brother . Shuri Castle was burned down in the conflict, which ended in the death of both Shiro and Furi, and the succession of Shō Taikyū to the throne.

Having studied under Kaiin, a Zen monk from Kyoto, Shō Taikyū had a number of Buddhist temples founded, including the Kōgen-ji, Fumon-ji, Manju-ji, and Tenryū-ji., and the so-called "Bridge of Nations" Bell cast. The bell, with an inscription describing the kingdom's prosperity in maritime trade and diplomacy, hung in Shuri Castle for centuries and became a famous symbol of the castle and of the kingdom.

Shō Taikyū's reign was, indeed, a period of prosperity in maritime trade. Historian George H. Kerr writes that Okinawan merchants sometimes earned as much as a thousand-percent return on luxury goods, that Naha grew more fully into a prosperous-looking port town, and the estates of the local lords (anji) grew as well. However, Kerr also writes that Shō Taikyū's patronage of Buddhism and temple-building efforts far exceeded that which would have been demanded or supported by the populace, and that these activities impoverished the royal treasury.

The reign of Shō Taikyū also saw one of the more famous episodes of political intrigues among the Aji in the history & legends of the kingdom. Informed by Amawari, lord of Katsuren gusuku and son-in-law of the king, that Gosamaru, lord of Nakagusuku and father-in-law to Shō Taikyū, was plotting to overthrow the kingdom, Shō Taikyū allowed Amawari to lead a royal contingent to subjugate Nakagusuku. Following Gosamaru's defeat and subsequent death, the king discovered that it was in fact Amawari who had been plotting against him from the beginning, and whose schemes led to the destruction of a loyal retainer. Katsuren was then subsequently attacked by the Ryukyuan army led by Uni-Ufugusuku, and Amawari captured and executed.

Upon his death in 1460, Shō Taikyū was succeeded by his son, Shō Toku.

Family
 Father: Shō Hashi
 Mother: daughter of Mitsuhata Iwaji
 Wife: daughter of Gosamaru
 Concubines:
 Miyazato Agunshitari-agomoshirare
 Lady Goekumura
 Children:
 Ashitomo Kanahashi by daughter of Gosamaru
 Mitsuhata Takeyoshi by daughter of Gosamaru
 Shō Toku by Miyazato-dono
 Sho Takeaji
 Momoto Fumiagari married Amawari
 Shō Majikana

See also 
 Imperial Chinese missions to the Ryukyu Kingdom

Notes

References
 Kerr, George H. (1965). Okinawa, the History of an Island People. Rutland, Vermont: C.E. Tuttle Co. OCLC  39242121

1415 births
1460 deaths
Kings of Ryūkyū
First Shō dynasty